Castleton Moor is a railway station on the Esk Valley Line, which runs between Middlesbrough and Whitby via Nunthorpe. It is owned by Network Rail and managed by Northern Trains.

History

The station opened in April 1861 as the temporary terminus of the North Yorkshire and Cleveland Railway route from Stokesley. This was extended eastwards to  four years later - formal opening occurring on 2 October 1865 with the station being named simply Castleton. In 1965, the station was renamed Castleton Moor.

Though the line was built with a single track, the station was provided with two platforms as it was the location of one of the route's passing loops.  A signal box was also constructed here, along with a goods shed and associated yard - these all survived (along with the loop) until the final withdrawal of goods services over the route in 1982.  The goods shed can still be seen but the loop has been lifted, the second platform removed and the box demolished.

Services

As of the May 2021 timetable change, the station is served by five trains per day (four on Sunday) towards Whitby. Heading towards Middlesbrough via Nunthorpe, there are six trains per day (four on Sunday). Most trains continue to Newcastle via Hartlepool. All services are operated by Northern Trains.

Rolling stock used: Class 156 Super Sprinter and Class 158 Express Sprinter

References

External links
 
 

Railway stations in the Borough of Scarborough
DfT Category F2 stations
Former North Eastern Railway (UK) stations
Railway stations in Great Britain opened in 1861
Northern franchise railway stations
1861 establishments in England